The Pickhandle barracuda (Sphyraena jello) is called this because the dark marks along its sides look like the thick ends of pickaxe handles. Sea anglers sometimes colloquially shorten the name to "pick". Among its many names are Banded Barracuda, Yellowtail Barracuda, and Sea Pike.

Morphology and Biology 
The silver body of the Pickhandle barracuda is outlined with approximately 20 wavy bars along the body of the fish, along with the dark marks. These dark markings fade under preservation. There is also a yellow caudal fin on the fish. One of its many features similar to other Barracuda is its underbite. 

It has been shown that Sphyraena jello feeds after releasing its gonads to spawn. This release creates space for the stomach to magnify its capacity for appropriate feeding. Sphyraena jello spawns  in the Persian Gulf in October and November.

Distribution and Habitat 
The Pickhandle barracuda can be found in many locations throughout the Pacific Ocean. They can usually be found in schools swimming in the tropical waters of the Pacific Ocean, particularly around coral reefs. However, during the night the pick handle barracuda begin to hunt. These fish can be found at many depths ranging from 2–200 meters.

References

Sphyraenidae
Fish described in 1829
Taxa named by Georges Cuvier